Korsia may refer to:
Haïm Korsia (born 1963), French rabbi
Korsia (island), island in the Greek Aegean Sea